The sailing events at the 2005 Mediterranean Games were organized by the Club de Mar in Almería, Spain. Athletes competed in three men's and two women's events.

Medal summary

Men's events

Women's events

Medal table

References
Mediterranean Games 2005 Results (PDF file)

Mediterranean Games
Sailing
2005
Sailing competitions in Spain